The Sage Colleges were a private educational institution comprising three institutions in New York State: 
Russell Sage College, a women's college in Troy; Sage College of Albany, a co-educational college in Albany; and the Sage Graduate School, which operated both in Troy and in Albany.

History
The first of the colleges to be established was Russell Sage College, which was founded in 1916 by Margaret Olivia Slocum Sage as a "School of Practical Arts".  Russell Sage was always a comprehensive college, offering both professional and liberal arts degrees.  It consistently been ranked in the top ten comprehensive colleges in the Northeast by U.S. News & World Report.  A "Men's Division" was established during World War II, and the first graduate degree was conferred by the college in 1942.  In 1949 the "Albany Division" was founded as a second, coeducational campus, offering associate, bachelor's and master's degrees.  In 1957 the two-year program, under the name "Sage Junior College of Albany", was granted authority to offer its own degrees.  In 1995, the Sage Graduate School was given permission to grant degrees independently, the Sage Evening College was recognized as a separate educational entity, and the four elements of Sage were rechartered together as The Sage Colleges.  In 2002 the two-year college and the evening college were subsumed in a new four-year college of professional studies, Sage College of Albany.  The three colleges, all part of the corporate institution The Sage Colleges, were governed by a common president, Dr. Christopher Ames, and a common Board of Trustees; each college had its own academic dean.

Due to declining enrollment and a high amount of debt, The Sage Colleges board of directors voted unanimously in March 2019 to merge the three colleges as one institution and rebrand Sage as Russell Sage College beginning in the fall of 2020.

Athletics
The Sage Colleges teams participated as a member of the National Collegiate Athletic Association's Division III. The Gators were a member of the Empire 8. Men's sports (Sage College of Albany) included basketball, cross country, golf, lacrosse, soccer, tennis, and volleyball; while women's sports (Russell Sage College) included basketball, cross country, lacrosse, soccer, softball, tennis and volleyball.

References

 
1916 establishments in New York (state)
Educational institutions established in 1916
Defunct private universities and colleges in New York (state)
Education in Capital District (New York)
Educational institutions disestablished in 2020
2020 disestablishments in New York (state)